IBCA may refer to:
 International Biennale of Contemporary Art 2005: A Second Sight (IBCA 2005)
 International Business Companies Act
 International Braille Chess Association, a chess organization for the visually impaired
 Inter Bank Credit Advice, (description needed)
 Israel, Britain and the Commonwealth Association 
Investment Banking Council of America
 Department of Interior Board of Contract Appeals
 International Brewing & Cider Awards